Emma Magdalena Sven-Eriksdotter Pajala (born 11 March 1988) is a Swedish female cross-country skier. She has competed in the World Cup since 2008. In January 2010, Pajala participated in the 2009-10 Tour de Ski and won the sprint event in the Swedish National Championship. In Tour de Ski, she finished ninth in the freestyle sprint and 10 km classical events, and ended up at 35th place in the overall rankings. At the 2010 Winter Olympics, Pajala finished fifth in the 4 × 5 km relay and tenth in the individual sprint event. Her best World Cup finish is fourth place at a sprint event in Drammen, Norway in March 2010.

Cross-country skiing results
All results are sourced from the International Ski Federation (FIS).

Olympic Games

World Championships

World Cup

Season standings

Team podiums
 1 podium – (1 )

References

External links 

  

1988 births
Living people
People from Gällivare Municipality
Cross-country skiers from Norrbotten County
Cross-country skiers at the 2010 Winter Olympics
Olympic cross-country skiers of Sweden
Swedish female cross-country skiers
Piteå Elit skiers
21st-century Swedish women